58 Leonis is a possible binary star system in the southern part of the constellation of Leo, near the border with Sextans. It shines with an apparent magnitude of 4.85, making it bright enough to be seen with the naked eye. An annual parallax shift of  yields a distance estimate of 360 light years. It is moving further from the Sun with a heliocentric radial velocity of +6 km/s.

It was identified as a barium star by P. M. Williams (1971). These are theorized to be stars that show an enrichment of s-process elements by mass transfer from a now-white dwarf companion when it passed through the asymptotic giant branch stage. MacConnell et al. (1972) classified 58 Leonis as a marginal barium star. De Castro et al. (2016) consider this to be only a probable barium star, because of the low degree of s-process enrichment, and they rejected it from their sample. Rather than having an evolved companion, it may instead have formed from a cloud that was mildly enriched with s-process elements.

References

External links
 58 Leonis in Hipparcos stars in Leo

K-type giants
Barium stars
Binary stars
Leo (constellation)
Leo, b
Durchmusterung objects
Leonis, 58
095345
053807
4291